Gary Powell may refer to:

 Gary Powell (musician) (born 1969), British drummer
 Gary Powell (footballer) (born 1969), English footballer
 Gary Powell (rugby union) (born 1979), rugby union player
 Gary Powell (actor) (born 1963), British actor